Balboa is a lunar impact crater that is located near the western limb of the Moon. Due to foreshortening, the crater appears highly oval when viewed from the Earth. In actuality, however, the formation is relatively circular. It is comparable in size to the crater Dalton, located just to the southwest. The eastern rim of Balboa lies just to the west of the Oceanus Procellarum.

The rim of Balboa is worn and eroded, with the most intact sections along the eastern and western edges. The crater interior has been flooded with basaltic lava in the past, and the system is marked with rilles, particularly near the northern edge.

Balboa A is a well-formed impact crater located just to the southeast of Balboa, with a sharp, notched rim and an irregular interior. Its diameter is only somewhat smaller than Dalton directly to the west.

Satellite craters 

By convention these features are identified on lunar maps by placing the letter on the side of the crater midpoint that is closest to Balboa.

References

External links
 

Impact craters on the Moon